The Quaid-e-Azam House, also known as Flagstaff House, is a house museum dedicated to the personal life of Muhammad Ali Jinnah, the founder of Pakistan. Located in Karachi, Sindh, Pakistan, it was designed by British architect Moses Somake.  

This is the former residence of Jinnah, who lived there from 1944 until his death in 1948. His sister, Fatima Jinnah lived there until 1964. It was bought by Jinnah in 1943 at the cost of 150,000 Pakistani Rupees . The building was later acquired in 1985 by the Pakistani government and converted to a museum.

Museum of Jinah
In 1984, it was converted into the Flagstaff House Museum of great Jinnah.

See also
 Jinnah family
 Wazir Mansion, Jinnah's birthplace in Karachi
 South Court, Muhammad Ali Jinnah's former residence in Mumbai, India, currently owned by the government of India.
 Muhammad Ali Jinnah House, Jinnah's former House at 10 Dr APJ Abdul Kalam Road, New Delhi, currently the Dutch Embassy in India.
 Quaid-e-Azam Residency in Ziarat, where Jinnah spent the last days of his life

References

External links

Renaming of Flagstaff House criticized – DAWN.com
Quaid-e-Azam House Museum

Museums and galleries in Karachi
Museums in Karachi
1985 establishments in Pakistan
Memorials to Muhammad Ali Jinnah
Heritage sites in Karachi